The Bazelet River is a  river in the Golan Heights. It flows through the Gamla Nature Reserve. The Bazelet Waterfall is a major feature of the river.

References

Landforms of the Golan Heights